Tani (alternatively Miric, Adi–Galo–Mising–Nishi-Tagin (Bradley 1997), or Abor–Miri–Dafla (Matisoff 2003)), is a branch of Sino-Tibetan languages spoken mostly in Arunachal Pradesh, Assam, and neighboring regions.

Background
The Tani languages are spoken by about 600,000 people of Arunachal Pradesh, including the Adi, Apatani,  Galo, Mising, Nyishi, Tagin, and of the East Kameng, West Kameng, Papumpare, Lower Subansiri, Upper Subansiri, West Siang, East Siang, Upper Siang, Lower Dibang Valley and Lohit districts of Arunachal Pradesh and Dhemaji, North Lakhimpur, Sonitpur etc. districts of Assam. In Arunachal Pradesh alone the Tani-speaking area covers some 40,000 square kilometers, or roughly half the size of the state. Scattered Tani communities spill over the Sino-Indian border into adjacent areas in Mêdog (Miguba people), Mainling (Bokar and Tagin peoples), and Lhünzê (Bangni, Na, Bayi, Dazu, and Mara peoples) counties of Tibet.

The name Tani was originally suggested by Jackson Tianshin Sun in his 1993 doctoral dissertation.

Classification
The Tani languages are conservatively classified as a distinct branch in Sino-Tibetan. Their closest relatives may be their eastern neighbors the Digaro languages, Taraon and Idu; this was first suggested by Sun (1993), but a relationship has not yet been systematically demonstrated. Blench (2014) suggests that Tani has a Greater Siangic substratum, with the Greater Siangic languages being a non-Sino-Tibetan language family consisting of Idu-Taraon and Siangic languages.

Mark Post (2015) observes that Tani typologically fits into the Mainland Southeast Asia linguistic area, which typically has creoloid morphosyntactic patterns, rather than with the languages of the Tibetosphere. Post (2015) also notes that Tani culture is similar to those of Mainland Southeast Asian hill tribe cultures, and is not particularly adapted to cold montane environments.

A provisional classification in Sun (1993), who argued that Tani is a primary branch of Tibeto-Burman (within Sino-Tibetan), is:

Eastern Tani (Adi/Abor)
?Damu
Bori
Mishing ( Plains Miri) – Padam (Bor Abor) – Minyong
Bokar (incl. Palibo & Ramo)
Western Tani
Apatani ( Apa)
Nishi
 Nishi ( E. Dafla, Nishing; possibly including Nyisu, Yano), Tagin ( W. Dafla), Bangni ( Na), Hill Miri ( Sarak), ?Gallong ( Duba, Galo)

To Eastern Tani, van Driem (2008) adds the following possible languages:
Tangam

Milang has traditionally been classified as a divergent Tani language, but in 2011 was tentatively reclassified as Siangic (Post & Blench 2011).

Proto-Tani was partially reconstructed by Sun (1993). A large number of reconstructed roots have cognates in other Sino-Tibetan languages. However, a great deal of Proto-Tani vocabulary have no cognates within Sino-Tibetan (Post 2011), and most Tani grammar seems to be secondary, without cognates in grammatically conservative Sino-Tibetan languages such as Jingpho or the Kiranti languages (Post 2006). Post (2012) suggests that Apatani and Milang have non-Tani substrata, and that as early Tani languages had expanded deeper into Arunachal Pradesh, mixing with non-Tani languages occurred.

Mark Post (2013) proposes the following revised classification for the Tani languages.

Tani
?Milang
Eastern Tani
Bori
Siang (Adi)
Minyong
Mising
Pasi
Padam
Bokar
Pre-Western Tani
Tangam, Damu?
Western Tani
Apatani
Subansiri
Bangni-Tagin
Nyishi–Hill Miri
Galo
Lare
Pugo

The undocumented Ashing language presumably belongs here.

However, Macario (2015) notes that many Apatani words are closer to reconstructions of Proto-Tibeto-Burman (Matisoff 2003) than to Proto-Tani (Sun 1993). Possible explanations include Apatani having a substratum belonging to an extinct Tibeto-Burman branch or language phylum, or linguistic variation in Proto-Tani.

Isoglosses
Sun (1993: 254-255) lists the following 25 lexical isoglosses between Western Tani and Eastern Tani.

Unified writing script

A new alphabetical writing system for Tani languages was invented by Tony Koyu, a social scientist from Itanagar, Arunachal Pradesh. It was first presented at a seminar at the North Eastern Regional Institute of Science and Technology at Nirjuli, Arunachal Pradesh in November 2001. It is not related to any other writing system, but some of the letters are similar to Bengali or Latin letters.

See also
 Siangic languages
 Greater Siangic languages

Notes

References
 Bradley, David, 1997. "Tibeto-Burman languages and classification." In David Bradley, ed. Tibeto-Burman languages of the Himalayas. Canberra, Australian National University Press: 1–72. .
 Blench, Roger (2014). Fallen leaves blow away: a neo-Hammarstromian approach to Sino-Tibetan classification. Presentation given at the University of New England, Armidale, 6 September 2014.
 James A. Matisoff, 2003. The Handbook of Proto-Tibeto-Burman: System and Philosophy of Sino-Tibetan Reconstruction. Berkeley, University of California Press. .
 van Driem, George, 2001. Languages of the Himalayas: An Ethnolinguistic Handbook of the Greater Himalayan Region. Brill. .
 Post, Mark, 2006. "Compounding and the structure of the Tani lexicon." Linguistics of the Tibeto-Burman Area 29 (1): 41–60.
 Post, Mark, 2011. "Isolate substrates, creolization and the internal diversity of Tibeto-Burman." Workshop on The Roots of Linguistic Diversity. The Cairns Institute, James Cook University, Australia, June 9–10.
 Post, Mark, 2012. "The language, culture, environment and origins of Proto-Tani speakers: What is knowable, and what is not (yet)." In T. Huber and S. Blackburn, Eds. Origins and Migrations in the Extended Eastern Himalayas. Leiden, Brill: 161–194. .
 Post, Mark W. and Roger Blench, 2011. "Siangic: A new language phylum in North East India." 6th International Conference of the North East Indian Linguistics Society, Tezpur University, Assam, India, January 29 – February 2.
 Sun, Tianshin Jackson, 1993. A Historical–Comparative Study of the Tani (Mirish) Branch in Tibeto-Burman. Berkeley, University of California PhD Dissertation.

 
Languages of Assam